Howard Allen Knight (December 22, 1926 – November 6, 2002) was a member of the Ohio House of Representatives.

Background
Knight worked in Insurance and his office was based in Fremont, Ohio. He was a state representative from 1963 to 1972.

References

Republican Party members of the Ohio House of Representatives
1926 births
2002 deaths
20th-century American politicians